In seven-dimensional geometry, a stericated 7-orthoplex is a convex uniform 7-polytope with 4th order truncations (sterication) of the regular 7-orthoplex.

There are 24 unique sterication for the 7-orthoplex with permutations of truncations, cantellations, and runcinations. 14 are more simply constructed from the 7-cube.

This polytope is one of 127 uniform 7-polytopes with B7 symmetry.

Stericated 7-orthoplex

Alternate names
 Small cellated hecatonicosoctaexon (Jonathan Bowers)

Images

Steritruncated 7-orthoplex

Alternate names
 Cellitruncated hecatonicosoctaexon (Jonathan Bowers)

Images

Bisteritruncated 7-orthoplex

Alternate names
 Bicellitruncated hecatonicosoctaexon (Jonathan Bowers)

Images

Stericantellated 7-orthoplex

Alternate names
 Cellirhombated hecatonicosoctaexon (Jonathan Bowers)

Images

Stericantitruncated 7-orthoplex

Alternate names
 Celligreatorhombated hecatonicosoctaexon (Jonathan Bowers)

Images

Bistericantitruncated 7-orthoplex

Alternate names
 Bicelligreatorhombated hecatonicosoctaexon (Jonathan Bowers)

Images

Steriruncinated 7-orthoplex

Alternate names
 Celliprismated hecatonicosoctaexon (Jonathan Bowers)

Images

Steriruncitruncated 7-orthoplex

Alternate names
 Celliprismatotruncated hecatonicosoctaexon (Jonathan Bowers)

Images

Steriruncicantellated 7-orthoplex

Alternate names
 Celliprismatorhombated hecatonicosoctaexon (Jonathan Bowers)

Images

Steriruncicantitruncated 7-orthoplex

Alternate names
 Great cellated hecatonicosoctaexon (Jonathan Bowers)

Images

Notes

References
 H.S.M. Coxeter:
 H.S.M. Coxeter, Regular Polytopes, 3rd Edition, Dover New York, 1973
 Kaleidoscopes: Selected Writings of H.S.M. Coxeter, edited by F. Arthur Sherk, Peter McMullen, Anthony C. Thompson, Asia Ivic Weiss, Wiley-Interscience Publication, 1995,  
 (Paper 22) H.S.M. Coxeter, Regular and Semi Regular Polytopes I, [Math. Zeit. 46 (1940) 380-407, MR 2,10]
 (Paper 23) H.S.M. Coxeter, Regular and Semi-Regular Polytopes II, [Math. Zeit. 188 (1985) 559-591]
 (Paper 24) H.S.M. Coxeter, Regular and Semi-Regular Polytopes III, [Math. Zeit. 200 (1988) 3-45]
 Norman Johnson Uniform Polytopes, Manuscript (1991)
 N.W. Johnson: The Theory of Uniform Polytopes and Honeycombs, Ph.D.

External links 
 Polytopes of Various Dimensions
 Multi-dimensional Glossary

7-polytopes